Marian Slavic (born 6 February 1946) is a Romanian former freestyle and medley swimmer. He competed in three events at the 1972 Summer Olympics.

References

External links
 

1946 births
Living people
Romanian male freestyle swimmers
Romanian male medley swimmers
Olympic swimmers of Romania
Swimmers at the 1972 Summer Olympics
Place of birth missing (living people)